Pałuki is a historic and ethnographic region lying in central Poland, part of Greater Poland neighbouring Pomerania and Kuyavia. In terms of administrative division the region lies in Kuyavian-Pomeranian Voivodship and Greater Poland Voivodship. A diverse relief, forests and numerous lakes serve as tourist attractions. 

Pałuki is commonly called "the land of 130 lakes" or sometimes even "Little Mazury". The "Piast Trail", leading through several places connected with the origins of the Polish State (Gniezno, Kruszwica), runs across the south of Pałuki. Żnin, Szubin, Kcynia and Barcin are major towns of the regions. Biskupin, Wenecja and Gąsawa also attract visitors.

The name Pałuki is likely derived from łuk, łęk, or łęg,  signifying grassy lowlands between arable land. An alternative theory suggests the name comes from the shape of the small hilltops which dot the landscape. The name appeared in the 14th century in the Latin form terra Palucacensis in documents by Jan of Czarnków and, later, Jan Długosz.

Photo gallery

See also
 Biskupin
 Kuyavian-Pomeranian Voivodship
 Narrow Gauge Railway Museum in Wenecja
 Wenecja
 Żnin

Regions of Poland